Shunk is an unincorporated community in Sullivan County, Pennsylvania, United States. Shunk has a post office with ZIP code 17768, which opened on November 5, 1845.

References

Unincorporated communities in Sullivan County, Pennsylvania
Unincorporated communities in Pennsylvania